The Pontifical University of Salamanca (in Spanish: Universidad Pontificia de Salamanca) is a private Roman Catholic university based in Salamanca, Spain.

History 
This Pontifical University has its origins in the unique University of Salamanca, founded in 1218 and one of the oldest institutions of all Europe and the whole world. Resulting from the resolution of the Spanish kingdom of dissolving the faculties of Theology and Canon Law at the University of Salamanca in 1854, Pope Pius XII decided to establish a new pontifical university and restore those faculties in a new institution. Additional faculties and schools were added over the years.

Olegario González de Cardedal, who received the Ratzinger Prize in 2011, teaches Dogmatic and Fundamental Theology. The University is famous thanks to its faculties of Philosophy, Psychology, Informatics and Education.

Degrees

Currently, the Pontifical University of Salamanca offers the following undergraduate degrees adapted to the European Higher Education Area :

Salamanca Campus
Canon Law
Sciences of Physical Activity and Sport
Communication Studies
Social Education
Nursing
Philosophy
Trilingual Biblical Philology
Humanities
Computer Science and Engineering
Speech Therapy
Master in Early Childhood Education
Teacher of Primary Education
Pedagogy
Journalism
Psychology
Advertising and Public Relations

Madrid Campus
Architecture
Building Engineering
Computer Science and Engineering
Industrial Management Engineering
Nursing
Osteopathy
Physiotherapy
Sociology

Notable alumni
 
 
 José María Vigil (born 1946), theologian

See also 
 List of Jesuit sites
 List of modern universities in Europe (1801–1945)

References

External links 
 

 
Pontifical universities
Universities in Castile and León
Salamanca
Educational institutions established in 1940
1940 establishments in Spain